Life imprisonment in Iceland is legal and the most severe punishment available under the Icelandic penal code since the death penalty was formally abolished in 1928. According to the General Penal Code from 1944 imprisonment may be imposed for life or for a certain period, not shorter than 30 days and not longer than 16 years. However in special cases it is permissible to increase the punishment from 16 years to 20 years.

General Penal Code, 19/1940 

Listed below are possible cases which life imprisonment may be imposed.

Cases which men have been sentenced to life imprisonment 
 In 1977 the Reykjavík Criminal Court sentenced two men to life imprisonment for the murder of two men in the Guðmundur and Geirfinnur case. The sentence was later overturned by the Supreme Court of Iceland
 In 1993 Þórður Jóhann Eyþórsson was convicted of his second murder in the District Court of Reykjavík and sentenced to life imprisonment. He committed the second murder while on parole for his first murder, committed in 1983. The conviction was overturned by the Supreme Court of Iceland and sentenced to be imprisoned for 20 years.

References 

 https://www.visindavefur.is/svar.php?id=53350

Iceland